The Greenwich Village Bookshop Door (1920–25) separated the back office from the main area of Frank Shay's Bookshop in Greenwich Village from 1920 until 1925, where it served as an autograph book for nearly two hundred and fifty authors, artists, publishers, poets, and Bohemian creatives. Notable signatories include Upton Sinclair, the Provincetown Players, John Sloan, Susan Glaspell, Theodore Dreiser, and Sinclair Lewis. The door has been held in the permanent collections of the Harry Ransom Center at the University of Texas at Austin since it was purchased in 1960.

History 
The bookshop door began its provenance at 11 Christopher Street in Greenwich Village, in the home of novelist and playwright Floyd Dell. The building was slated for demolition in 1920 when the owner of the bookshop across the street, Frank Shay, spotted the then-bright red door and salvaged it for his office. Much is yet unknown about The Greenwich Village Bookshop Door, including why individuals were chosen to sign it, which way the door originally faced, when exactly the signatures began and ended, or even when it was painted blue.

Frank Shay's Bookshop 
Frank Shay opened his bookshop in October 1920 at 4 Christopher Street, in what had previously been the Columbia Cafe where John Masefield briefly worked as a bar-back in the mid-1890s. Another portion of the building functioned as an art studio owned by Winold Reiss until 1921, when Shay obtained the space and effectively doubled the size of his bookshop.Until the door was rescued from Floyd Dell's old apartment, Frank Shay's office was separated from the rest of his bookshop by a thin sheet that hung in the doorway. Though Shay himself never admitted it, authors William McFee and Christopher Morley would eventually both write that Frank had taken the door for more privacy as several customers and friends had seen the silhouette of him drinking in his office after the prohibition had outlawed such activity.
The signatures began on the door before Shay even had the chance to repaint it, resulting in the large unpainted areas that remain on the door today. According to Christopher Morley, author Hendrik Willem van Loon was the first to sign the door; doing so spontaneously and accompanying his name with a doodle of a sailing ship. The earliest dated signatures, those of John Van Alstyne Weaver and Porter Garnett, were added on October 17, 1921.

Frank cultivated a creative environment in his bookshop that encouraged publishers, writers, artists, theater directors, actors, cartoonists, illustrators, political activists and more to socialize and gather at his shop. Shay went beyond selling books, going so far as to edit plays for other publishing houses, lecture on the importance of books and bookselling, create a circulating library, and put a great deal of effort into his award-winning window displays. In 1921, inspired by his friend Christopher Morley's 1917 novel Parnassus on Wheels, Shay modified a Ford truck for the purpose of mobile book selling.Frank Shay's Bookshop shelves were lined with popular novels, children's books, socialist pamphlets and avant-garde chapbooks. He placed a particular emphasis on carrying the books of Walt Whitman and Joseph Conrad. Many early 20th-century booksellers expanded their businesses by adding publishing services and Frank Shay was no exception. The bookshop published a poetry magazine titled The Measure, the Salvo series of chapbooks, a local newspaper titled The Greenwich Villager, and numerous books and booklets of poetry, prose, and plays. The bookshop even printed their own set of branded stationery and envelopes.

Frank Shay sold his bookshop sometime during the summer of 1924, after his wife (Fern Forrester Shay) gave birth to their daughter Jean. The family moved to Provincetown, Massachusetts shortly after, opening a new bookshop in the Cape Cod area under the same name as the original. The bookshop in New York City appeared as "The Greenwich Village Bookshop" several times before closing permanently approximately a year later. While delivering a lecture at the University of Pennsylvania in 1931, author Christopher Morley said "It was too personal, too enchanting, too Bohemian a bookshop to survive indefinitely, but for five or six years it played a very real part in the creative life of New York City."

The original building that housed Frank Shay's Bookshop at 4 Christopher Street was demolished and replaced by a modern building sometime around 1960, less than a decade before the creation of the Greenwich Village Historic District would have protected it from destruction.

After the bookshop 

Creditors acquired the full inventory and contents of the shop sometime during August 1925, as financial circumstances caused the bookshop to close. Shop manager Juliette Koenig noticed that the repossession crew had ignored the door, so she took it off of its hinges and enlisted several writers to bring it back to her apartment. Finding it interesting enough to protect with varnish and store in her house for more than three decades, Juliette Koenig Smith eventually sold the door to the University of Texas at Austin through an art dealer in 1960. At this time the door was accompanied by a list of approximately 25 identified signatures and a letter from Christopher Morley that thanked Juliette for rescuing the door. The original advertisement published in the Saturday Review read:
The Harry Ransom Center at the University of Texas at Austin responded to the advertisement and purchased the door, subsequently allowing it to remain undisturbed in their collections for over a decade until a graduate student named Anna Lou Ashby discovered it in storage in 1972. While completing the first official research on the door, Ashby was able to identify 25 more signatures including those of Egmont Arens, Albert Boni, Robert Nathan, and Max Liebermann. After Ashby's brief research the door was again returned to storage where it remained for several more decades. The bookshop door was rediscovered again in 2008 and research was quickly organized by Molly Schwartzburg, a curator of literature at the University of Texas at Austin.

The Greenwich Village Bookshop Door: A Portal to Bohemia, 1920–1925 
The Harry Ransom Center mounted The Greenwich Village Bookshop Door: A Portal to Bohemia, 1920–1925 exhibition from September 6, 2011, until January 22, 2012. The exhibition marked the first and thus far only public show to include the bookshop door, with curation headed by Molly Schwartzburg. For the duration of the exhibition The Greenwich Village Bookshop Door was installed in the middle of a gallery, on a custom blue base that exactly matched the color of the door. It was encased in plexiglas and anchored to the ceiling with steel wires for added security.Historians at the Harry Ransom Center were able to use online photograph databases and collections in 2010 to prepare for the exhibition, relying on technology that was not available when the university first acquired the door in 1960. Curators educated themselves on twentieth-century penmanship techniques to correctly match signatures on the door to those found on original manuscripts, novels, poems, letters, drawings and more. Their diligence resulted in the identification of more than one hundred and fifty additional signatures.

The physical exhibition ran concurrently with a more in-depth online, virtual exhibit that was still accessible as of 2022. This online exhibit allowed viewers to learn more about each of the identified signatories and their connections to one another. The Harry Ransom Center continues to operate a website highlighting the door's yet unidentified signatures in hopes of using the public's assistance to eventually identify every signature on the door.

In 2012, the Harry Ransom Center was nominated for an Austin Critics' Table award for "Best Museum Exhibition" for their work on The Greenwich Valley Bookshop Door: A Portal to Bohemia exhibition. The Austin Critics' Table awards are a series of longstanding Austin awards that seek to honor those involved in all aspects of the local art scene.

Signatures 

Approximately 25 autographs had been identified and connected to their respective owners by the time the University of Texas obtained the door in 1960. As of 2021, only 47 of the 242 total signatures remained unidentified. Two individuals, Laurie York Erskine and Don Marquis, signed the door on two separate occasions, and a handful of signatures are from fictional characters. During research for the 2011 exhibition historians separated the known signatures into five major groups: writing, publishing, visual arts, performance, and social groups. Many names are featured in more than one category, as day jobs overlapped with hobbies and social groups that all intersected at Frank Shay's Bookshop.

A wide selection of those involved in the 1920s literary scene in New York City and beyond signed The Greenwich Village Bookshop Door. Many worked as publishers, librarians, booksellers, and both magazine and book editors. Signatures included in the writing category consist of those of poets, historians, translators, critics, fiction and travel writers, playwrights, humorists, journalists, and screenwriters. Many of the individuals in this category had their writings censored by the New York Society for the Suppression of Vice, an organization that claimed to supervise public morality.

The performance category of signatures includes theater directors, stage actors, those employed in the early film industry, and members of theater troupes like the Provincetown Players and the Washington Square Players. Visual artists who signed The Greenwich Village Bookshop Door included architects, sculptors, cartoonists, photographers, industrial designers, illustrators, typographers and more. Both the Art Students League and the 1913 Armory Show are represented by a handful of signatures.

At least one member of the following social groups signed The Greenwich Village Bookshop Door: Skull and Bones, Three Hours for Lunch Club, Algonquin Round Table, and the Bohemian Club. Several politicians, teachers, seafarers, and Greenwich Village business owners also signed the door. Additionally, thirty-two signatures have been identified as belonging to men who served as soldiers or war correspondents in World War I.

See also 

 The Greenwich Village Bookshop Door: A Portal to Bohemia, 1920–1925

References 

Greenwich Village
University of Texas at Austin